Igor Osredkar (born 28 June 1986) is a Slovenian futsal player who plays for Futsal Pula and the Slovenian national futsal team.

References

External links
UEFA profile

1986 births
Living people
Slovenian men's futsal players
Slovenian expatriate sportspeople in Croatia
Futsal defenders